Khalifa Point is a coastal cape west of Isa, a small town located in Lasbela District, Balochistan, Pakistan.

PARCO Coastal Refinery Limited Project 
The latest estimates for setting up an oil refinery project by Abu Dhabi's International Petroleum Investment Company (IPIC) is $5 billion. This will increase substantially, as the project now will include a petrochemical city, power generation plant, a port and other necessary infrastructure.

See also 
 Lasbela District
 Coastal Refinery

References

External links 
 Coastal Refinery Limited

Lasbela District